The 1982–83 season was the 45th season of competitive association football in the Football League played by Chester, an English club based in Chester, Cheshire.

Also, it was the first season spent in the Fourth Division after the relegation from the Third Division in 1982. Alongside competing in the Football League the club also participated in the FA Cup and the Football League Cup.

Football League

Results summary

Results by matchday

Matches

FA Cup

League Cup

Football League Trophy

Season statistics

References

1982-83
English football clubs 1982–83 season